John James Gilchrist (February 16, 1809 – April 29, 1858) was a Justice and chief justice of the New Hampshire Superior Court of Judicature and a judge and Presiding Judge of the Court of Claims.

Education and career

Born on February 16, 1809, in Medford, Massachusetts, graduated from Harvard University in 1828, and graduated from Harvard Law School in 1831. He entered private practice in Charlestown, New Hampshire from 1831 to 1836. He was a member of the New Hampshire House of Representatives from 1836 to 1837. He was register of probate for Sullivan County, New Hampshire in 1836. He was a justice of the New Hampshire Superior Court of Judicature (now the Supreme Court of New Hampshire) from 1840 to 1855, serving as chief justice from 1848 to 1855.

Federal judicial service

Gilchrist was nominated by President Franklin Pierce on March 3, 1855, to the Court of Claims (later the United States Court of Claims), to a new seat authorized by 10 Stat. 612. He was confirmed by the United States Senate on March 3, 1855, and received his commission the same day. He served as Presiding Judge from 1855 to 1858. His service terminated on April 29, 1858, due to his death in Washington, D.C.

References

Sources

External links
 

1809 births
1858 deaths
People from Charlestown, New Hampshire
Harvard Law School alumni
Members of the New Hampshire House of Representatives
Chief Justices of the New Hampshire Supreme Court
Judges of the United States Court of Claims
United States Article I federal judges appointed by Franklin Pierce
19th-century American judges
Harvard College alumni
19th-century American politicians